Janet Craig McKutcheon Mackenzie (3 July 1878 – 14 July 1962) was a New Zealand teacher and correspondence teacher. She was born in Edinburgh, Midlothian, Scotland, on 3 July 1878.

References

1878 births
1962 deaths
New Zealand schoolteachers
Scottish emigrants to New Zealand
Schoolteachers from Edinburgh
People educated at Nelson College for Girls